The U80701 is a 32-bit microprocessor developed from 1986-1990 in the German Democratic Republic. It was manufactured by VEB Mikroelektronik "Karl Marx" Erfurt (MME) in NMOS technology and is encased in a ceramic quad flat package (CQFP-68 package).

Microprocessor
The U80701 was developed by reverse engineering the MicroVAX 78032 microprocessor of the Digital Equipment Corporation (DEC). It is used in the Robotron K 1820 minicomputer - a clone of the DEC MicroVAX II.

The U80700 system includes the following chips:

U80701: CPU (DC333)
U80703: FPU (DC337)
U80707: Console interface/controller DLART (DC319)
U80709: CPU interface gate array (DC379)
U80711: Q22-Bus interface gate array (DC380)

References

External links
Chip photos of the DEC 78032 and U80701
Soviet, MicroVAX II compatible mainboard with U80701FC 

Kombinat Mikroelektronik microprocessors
32-bit microprocessors